Attorney General Meek may refer to:

A. R. Meek (1834–1888), Attorney General of Florida
Alexander Beaufort Meek (1814–1865), Attorney General of Alabama